Group A of the 1994 Federation Cup Asia/Oceania Zone was one of four pools in the Asia/Oceania zone of the 1994 Federation Cup. Four teams competed in a round robin competition, with the top two teams advancing to the knockout stage.

Philippines vs. Syria

Chinese Taipei vs. India

Philippines vs. India

Chinese Taipei vs. Syria

Philippines vs. Chinese Taipei

India vs. Syria

See also
Fed Cup structure

References

External links
 Fed Cup website

1994 Federation Cup Asia/Oceania Zone